Sky Shadows is an album by saxophonist Eric Kloss which was recorded in 1968 and released on the Prestige label.

Reception

AllMusic stated: "This 1968 release from saxophonist Eric Kloss has many fine points and a couple of puzzling technical lapses. Kloss, heard on alto and tenor, is definitely one of the strengths. Only 19 at the time of this session, the young sax player is well up to the challenge of playing with his more seasoned bandmates".

Track listing 
All compositions by Eric Kloss except as indicated
 "In a Country Soul Garden" - 6:23  
 "Sky Shadows" (Pat Martino) - 13:16  
 "The Girl With the Fall in Her Hair" - 6:43  
 "I'll Give You Everything" - 6:41  
 "January's Child" - 7:07

Personnel 
Eric Kloss - alto saxophone, tenor saxophone
Jaki Byard - piano 
Pat Martino - guitar
Bob Cranshaw - bass
Jack DeJohnette - drums

References 

1968 albums
Eric Kloss albums
Prestige Records albums
Albums produced by Don Schlitten